Granulobasidium is a genus of fungi in the family Cyphellaceae.

References

External links
 Index Fungorum

Cyphellaceae
Monotypic Agaricales genera